The Evangelische Arbeitsgemeinschaft für Kirchliche Zeitgeschichte (EvAKiZ) (= Protestant Association for Church History) is concerned with the scientific examination of issues and methods of contemporary church history. Most recent church history is evaluated by the EvAKiZ in scientific autonomy. Its members are representatives of theology, historical science, sociology and history of art. In its editorial series the EvAKiZ publishes contemporary historical sources and scientific surveys of the history of 20th century Protestantism.

History 

Appointed by the Council of the Evangelische Kirche in Deutschland (= Evangelical Church in Germany) as „Kommission für die Geschichte des Kirchenkampfes in der nationalsozialistischen Zeit“ (= Commission for the History of the Struggle Between Church and State in the National Socialist Era) in 1955, two charges were assigned to the Evangelischen Arbeitsgemeinschaft für Kirchliche Zeitgeschichte in its early stages: On a universal level, building a bridge between members of the “radical” and the “moderate” Confessing Church and simultaneously providing an initial scientific basis for the study of the history of the Protestant Church during national socialist times by collecting document files, founding a library and editing the „Arbeiten zur Geschichte des Kirchenkampfes“ (Studies on the History of the Struggle between Church and State).

Very soon the EvAKiZ's field of research expanded to the survey of the role of Protestantism in the Weimar Republic and in the period after World War II. At once territorial and everyday history gained in importance. In 1971 the renaming from „Kommission für die Geschichte des Kirchenkampfes in der nationalsozialistischen Zeit“ to „Evangelische Arbeitsgemeinschaft für Kirchliche Zeitgeschichte“ was therefore consequent and documented the thematic diversification as well as a liberalization in direction of social sciences. Complemented with members of the new federal states from 1989 onwards the consortium was engaged in two major research projects concerned with the history of the Protestant Church in the GDR and in the divided Germany.

The second reorientation took place in the 1990s, as the EvAKiZ focused on issues of research on contemporary history in the 1960s and '70s from a more social historical point of view. This broadening of perspective is datable: It was the jubilee symposium on the 50. anniversary of the EvAKiZ in 2005 which issued the relations between Protestantism and social movements in the 1960s and '70s and thereby created a lasting enhancement of the research program. The history of Protestantism during the national socialist era nevertheless remained a focal point which, i. a., resulted in two major projects: a comprehensive anthology on 20th century's Protestant Martyrs and a virtual exhibition about Protestant resistance and its boundaries in Nazi Germany.

Organization 
The Evangelische Arbeitsgemeinschaft comprises a commission consisting of twelve regular and three members at large, who relate to contemporary church history due to their research work and professional employment, and further a Research Center for Contemporary Church History, located at the Faculty of Protestant Theology at Ludwig-Maximilians-Universität (LMU) München. The EvAKiZ is an institution of the Evangelische Kirche in Deutschland (EKD) and is operating in scientific autonomy. Following the rules of the EvAKiZ of January 23, 2003, its commission is respectively summoned for six years by the Council of the EKD. The commission decides about research assignments and publications. The Research Center realizes these projects, takes on research assignments in the domain of contemporary church history as well as the management of the commission. It is composed of a director and several scientific associates.

Members and Staff 

Forschungsstelle für Kirchliche Zeitgeschichte (= Research Center For Contemporary Church History)

Director 
 Prof. Dr. Claudia Lepp
Research Fellows
 Dr. Karl-Heinz Fix
 Dr. Dagmar Pöpping
 Nora Andrea Schulze

Aims and Objectives 
Aim of the Evangelische Arbeitsgemeinschaft für Kirchliche Zeitgeschichte is the enhancement of scientifically independent study of church history by incitation, implementation and publication of dissertations.
The EvAKiZ tries to clarify fundamental scientific questions and pursues cooperation with other institutions in the research field of contemporary history as well as the coordination of contemporary history research projects within the Evangelical Church in Germany. The mission of the commission is implemented by its research and publication activities and the realization of research projects at the research center and organization of expert conferences. Constitutive source editions provide an empirical material base for appropriate studies in contemporary history. Studies emerging from the context of the commission cover the wide range of church historiographical, source-oriented individual questions to fundamental theoretical problems within their own discipline.

Source editions and monographs are endued with separate publication series (Arbeiten zur Kirchlichen Zeitgeschichte, Reihe A: Quellen, Reihe B: Darstellungen).

The annually published „Mitteilungen zur Kirchlichen Zeitgeschichte“ (MKiZ) (= „Minutes on Contemporary Church History”) contain essays on 20th century's German and European church and denomination history; its reports section offers profound information about current activities in the domain of contemporary church history.

Research Projects 

Current Research Projects

 Online-Exhibition: Resistance!? Protestant Male and Female Christs in the National Socialist Era.
 Memorial Sites for Protestant Resistants against National Socialism.
 Christianity and Social Changes in the 1960s and 70s
 Social Integration and National Identity
 “Guest Workers Become Citizens”. The Protestant Contribution to Issues of Integration of Migrant Workers in the Federal Republic of Germany (1955–1981).
 The Reports of the Reichsbruderrat of the German Evangelical Church (1934–1937) and the Bruderrat of the Evangelical Church in Germany (1945–1952) – Critical Edition
 Biography of Hans Meiser (1881–1956)
 Hermann Kunst: Status Reports 1951–1977
 The Protestant Churches in Germany 1918/19–1949 – Vol. 2: Regional Church Offices, Institutions and Associations.
 Documents on Church Policy in the Third Reich 1933–1945
 Responsibility for the Church – Stenographic Records and Notes of Regional Bishop Hans Meiser 1933–1945
 ....Approval, Confirmation and Objection. Sources on the History of the Evangelical Lutheran Church in Bavaria during the National Socialist Rule

Publications 

 Arbeiten zur Kirchlichen Zeitgeschichte (= Studies on Contemporary Church History)
 Sources (Series A): Vol. 1–19

Since 1975 the Studies on Contemporary Church History (Arbeiten zur Kirchlichen Zeitgeschichte) are published at Vandenhoeck & Ruprecht publishing house on behalf of the Evangelische Arbeitsgemeinschaft für Kirchliche Zeitgeschichte. Editors are the respective chairmen of the commission. In series A sources on 20th century's church history are edited; in series B monographs and anthologies on the history of German Protestantism and its international relations since 1918 are published.

 Comprehensive Reports (Series B): Vol. 1–61
 Arbeiten zur Geschichte des Kirchenkampfes (= Studies on the History of the Struggle between Church and State)
Between 1958 and 1975 the “Studies on the History of the Struggle between Church and State” were published in a series of 29 volumes plus one index volume. The contain e. g. documents on the most significant synods of the Confessing Church, scripts from the time of the church committees (1935–1937) as well as territorial historical or factual monographic displays. In the “supplement series” released from 1964 onwards, mainly territorial historical accounts of contemporary witnesses were published as well as relevant DDR publications incorporated.
 Christentum und Zeitgeschichte (= Christianity and Contemporary History)
Since 2017 the series Christianity and Contemporary History is published at the Evangelische Verlagsanstalt in Leipzig. It contains short describtions of topics, that refer to Contemporary History and its relation to Christianity. It is published on behalf of the “Evangelische Arbeitsgemeinschaft für Kirchliche Zeitgeschichte“ by Harry Oelke and Siegfried Hermle.

Editorial Board 
 Vol. 1-21: Edited on behalf of the „Commission of the Evangelical Church in Germany for the History of the Struggle between Church and State” by Kurt Dietrich Schmidt in connection with Heinz Brunotte and Ernst Wolf.
 Vol. 22–27: Established by Kurt Dietrich Schmidt. Edited on behalf of the „Commission of the Evangelical Church in Germany for the History of the Struggle between Church and State” by Heinz Brunotte and Ernst Wolf.
 Vol. 28–30: Established by Kurt Dietrich Schmidt. Edited on behalf of the “Evangelische Arbeitsgemeinschaft für Kirchliche Zeitgeschichte“ by Heinz Brunotte and Ernst Wolf at Vandenhoeck & Ruprecht publishing house, Göttingen.
 Mitteilungen zur Kirchlichen Zeitgeschichte (MKiZ) (= Minutes on Contemporary Church History)

The „Minutes on Contemporary Church History“, serialized from 2007 onwards, comprise essays on 20th century's German and European church and denomination history; its reports section offers profound information about current activities in the domain of contemporary church history. The MKiZ are published on behalf of the “Evangelische Arbeitsgemeinschaft für Kirchliche Zeitgeschichte“ by Claudia Lepp and Harry Oelke. Their prequels were the „Mitteilungen der Evangelischen Arbeitsgemeinschaft für Kirchliche Zeitgeschichte“ 1, 1978ff.

Bibliography 
 Carsten Nicolaisen: Zwischen Theologie und Geschichte. Zur kirchlichen Zeitgeschichte heute. In: Der Evangelische Erzieher 42, 1990, S. 410–419.
 Joachim Mehlhausen: Die Evangelische Arbeitsgemeinschaft für Kirchliche Zeitgeschichte und die Erforschung der Kirchengeschichte der DDR. In: Evangelische Arbeitsgemeinschaft für Kirchliche Zeitgeschichte. Mitteilungen 13, 1993, S. 1–6.
 Leonore Siegele-Wenschkewitz: Probleme Kirchlicher Zeitgeschichtsforschung. In: Leonore Siegele-Wenschkewitz (Hg.): Die evangelischen Kirchen und der SED-Staat – ein Thema kirchlicher Zeitgeschichte (Arnoldshainer Texte. 77). Frankfurt am Main 1993, S. 142–151.
 Jochen-Christoph Kaiser: Wissenschaftspolitik in der Kirche. Zur Entstehung der „Kommission für die Geschichte des Kirchenkampfes in der nationalsozialistischen Zeit“. In: Anselm Doering-Manteuffel / Kurt Nowak (Hg.): Kirchliche Zeitgeschichte. Urteilsbildung und Methoden (KoGe 8). Stuttgart u.a. 1996, S. 125–163.
 Harry Oelke: Thesen zur Katholizismusforschung – ein Kommentar In: Wilhelm Damberg / Joseph Hummel (Hg.): Katholizismus in Deutschland. Zeitgeschichte und Gegenwart (VKZG.B 130). Paderborn 2015, S. 163–168.

Notes

External links 

Evangelische Arbeitsgemeinschaft für Kirchliche Zeitgeschichte
Widerstand!?– Exhibition on the Resistance of Male and Female Protestant Christs in the National Socialist Era
Evangelische Kirche in Deutschland
Vandenhoeck & Ruprecht: Arbeiten zur Kirchlichen Zeitgeschichte
Evangelisch-Theologische Fakultät der Ludwig-Maximilians-Universität München

Evangelical Church in Germany
Historiography of Christianity
Ludwig Maximilian University of Munich
Research institutes established in 1955
Research institutes in Munich
1955 establishments in West Germany